Miguel Vargas may refer to:

Miguel Vargas (politician) (born 1950), Dominican politician
Miguel Vargas (runner) (born 1957), Costa Rican long-distance runner
Miguel Vargas (footballer, born 1969), Chilean football midfielder
Miguel Vargas (footballer, born 1978), Portuguese winger
Miguel Vargas (footballer, born 1996), Chilean-Peruvian goalkeeper
Miguel Vargas (baseball) (born 1999), Cuban baseball player